Clara Rousby (1848–1879) was an actress who made notable appearances on the London stage.

Life
Clara Marion Jessie Dowse was born in 1848 at Parkhurst, Isle of Wight. She was the daughter of Dr. Richard Dowse who was the inspector-general of hospitals. She moved to Plymouth when her father retired. She met Wybert Rousby, who was an actor and theatre manager from Jersey, at the theatre. Her husband was a noted Roman Catholic convert. They married in 1868. They were acting when they were talented-spotted in Jersey and recommended to the leading London playwright Tom Taylor.

They both appeared at the Queens Theatre in Long Acre with Mrs. Rousby as Fiordelisa, and Mr. Rousby as Bertuccio in Taylor's The Fool's Revenge. Rousby was referred to as the "beautiful Mrs Rousby". She then went on to play Joan of Arc where the realisation of her being burnt raised objections. Her last appearance was in 1878, after which she went to Germany on the advice of her doctor where she died on 19 April 1879.

References

External links
 Jose Mora portrait ca.1870s
 Mrs Rousby portraits ca.1864-1888 at State Library Victoria.

1848 births
1879 deaths
Actors from the Isle of Wight
Actresses from London